Nabih Al Jurdi (born 9 May 1967) is a Lebanese former footballer who played as a right-back.

Club career 
Coming through the youth system, Al Jurdi began his career at local club Safa during the Lebanese Civil War; he made his debut in 1986.

International career 
Al Jurdi first joined the Lebanon national team in 1987, playing against Syria in a 1988 Arab Cup qualifying game. He scored one international goal, against Kazakhstan at the 1998 Asian Games. Al Jurdi played 45 international games for Lebanon.

Career statistics 
Scores and results list Lebanon's goal tally first, score column indicates score after each Al Jurdi goal.

Honours
Individual
 Lebanese Premier League Team of the Season: 1996–97, 1997–98, 1998–99

References

External links
 
 

1967 births
Living people
Lebanese footballers
Association football fullbacks
Safa SC players
Racing Club Beirut players
Al Mabarra Club players
Lebanese Premier League players
Lebanese Second Division players
Lebanon international footballers